Richard "Rich" Kenah (born August 4, 1970 in Montclair, New Jersey) is a former US middle-distance runner who won bronze medals over 800 metres at the 1997 World Indoor Championships and at the World Championships in Athens. After placing second in the Olympic 800m Trials, Kenah ran in the 2000 Summer Olympics in Sydney, placing 6th in his 800-meter heat.

Personal Bests

Personal life 
Kenah attended Immaculate Conception High School in Montclair, New Jersey. He graduated from Georgetown University with a degree in International Marketing in 1992. He is now married to fellow runner Cheri Goddard-Kenah and resides in Atlanta, GA. Since 2014, Kenah has served as the Executive Director at the Atlanta Track Club, the second largest running organization in the country. The organization hosts over 30 events per year, including the world largest 10k, the AJC Peachtree Road Race. Kenah has helped to grow the Atlanta Track Club Elite Team, a professional running group coached by ex-professional runners Andrew and Amy Begley.

Kenah was formerly the marketing director at Global Athletics & Marketing, a boutique sports marketing firm managing top Olympic stars including Tirunesh Dibaba, Meseret Defar and Nick Willis.

References

External links
 Rich Kenah at USATF
 
 
 

1970 births
Living people
American male middle-distance runners
McDonough School of Business alumni
Athletes (track and field) at the 2000 Summer Olympics
Olympic track and field athletes of the United States
People from Montclair, New Jersey
World Athletics Championships medalists